Rustling for Cupid is a 1926 American silent Western film directed by Irving Cummings and starring George O'Brien, Anita Stewart and Russell Simpson.

Cast
 George O'Brien as Bradley Blatchford 
 Anita Stewart as Sybil Hamilton 
 Russell Simpson as Hank Blatchford 
 Edith Yorke as Mrs. Blatchford 
 Herbert Prior as Tom Martin 
 Frank McGlynn Jr. as Dave Martin 
 Sid Jordan as Jack Mason

References

Bibliography
 Langman, Larry. A Guide to Silent Westerns. Greenwood Publishing Group, 1992.

External links
 

1926 films
1926 Western (genre) films
Fox Film films
Films directed by Irving Cummings
American black-and-white films
American silent feature films
Silent American Western (genre) films
1920s American films